The Pentax smc DA 17-70mm F4.0 AL (IF) SDM is a constant maximum aperture standard zoom lens announced by Pentax on June 3, 2008.

References
 Pentax smc DA 17-70mm F4.0 AL (IF) SDM Specs

17
Camera lenses introduced in 2008